Reeson Wayne "Reece" Shearsmith (born 27 August 1969) is an English actor, writer and comedian. He is best known for being a member of The League of Gentlemen, alongside Steve Pemberton, Mark Gatiss, and Jeremy Dyson. With Pemberton, he later created, wrote and starred in the sitcom Psychoville, as well as the dark comedy anthology series, Inside No. 9.

He has also had notable roles in Spaced and The World's End.

Early life
Shearsmith was born in Hull, East Riding of Yorkshire, as Reeson Wayne Shearsmith. He attended Andrew Marvell High School and then Bretton Hall College of Education where he met Mark Gatiss and Steve Pemberton.

Career

1995–2005: Career beginnings and The League of Gentlemen
The League of Gentlemen began as a stage act in 1995, transferred to Radio 4 as On the Town with The League of Gentlemen in 1997 and then arrived on television on BBC Two in 1999.

The latter saw Shearsmith and his colleagues awarded a British Academy Television Award, a Royal Television Society Award and the prestigious Golden Rose of Montreux.

Following The League of Gentlemen, Shearsmith appeared in comedy programmes including Max and Paddy's Road to Nowhere as well as playing villain Tony in the Vic Reeves and Bob Mortimer comedy Catterick.

He appeared in two episodes of the award-winning pop-culture comedy Spaced as Robot Wars obsessed TA soldier Dexter and played neurotic Doctor Flynn in hospital sitcom TLC alongside Alexander Armstrong.

2005–2013: Theatre,  Psychoville and continued success
From March 2006 to January 2007, he appeared in the West End as Leo Bloom in The Producers.

In the 2008 English language DVD release of the cult 2006 Norwegian animated film Free Jimmy, Shearsmith voiced the character of "Ante", a heavy-set, bizarrely-dressed biker member of the "Lappish Mafia". In this, his voice is used along with Steve Pemberton and Mark Gatiss.

Psychoville began June 2009 and marked his return to BBC2. The dark comedy series was written by Shearsmith and his League of Gentlemen writing partner Steve Pemberton. Both Shearsmith and Pemberton played numerous characters in the programme, which ran for two series and a Halloween special.

In 2010 Shearsmith appeared in the John Landis black comedy Burke & Hare.

In 2011, Cameron Mackintosh's new musical Betty Blue Eyes opened in the West End, in which Shearsmith played downtrodden husband Gilbert Chilvers (a chiropodist) alongside Sarah Lancashire. Also in 2011, he played Harry Wiseman in Eric & Ernie, a feature-length TV drama about Morecambe and Wise.

In 2012, he appeared in Bad Sugar, a comedy pilot written by Sam Bain & Jesse Armstrong, along with Olivia Colman, Julia Davis and Sharon Horgan. A full series order was cancelled due to availability of the writers and cast. He also appeared in comedy pilot The Function Room.

In 2013, he played Patrick Troughton in An Adventure in Space and Time, a docu-drama about the conception and making of Doctor Who, which was written by Mark Gatiss.

He worked with Vic Reeves and Bob Mortimer again in the first series of House of Fools as Martin the ghost and in the Christmas special as Santa. He made two guest appearances in Jeremy Dyson's Psychobitches as Old Mother Shipton in series one and Princess Margaret in series two. Also in 2013, he starred in Ben Wheatley's A Field in England as Whitehead and appeared in The World's End.

2014–present: Inside No. 9, ITV dramas and awards
In 2014, Shearsmith and Pemberton returned to BBC2 with a new dark comedy series called Inside No. 9. Each episode of the anthology series takes place in a different 'No. 9' location. Shearsmith and Pemberton play various characters in the series and have also directed two of the episodes. Also in 2014, he starred as Malcolm Webster in ITV drama series, based on a true story, The Widower.

He starred as Detective Sergeant Stone in Chasing Shadows, an ITV drama series about missing persons.

In 2015, he played Gagan Rassmussen in the Series 9 Doctor Who episode "Sleep No More", Steele in High-Rise directed by Ben Wheatley, Ray in Peter Kay's Car Share and Pastor John in the Christmas specials of Julia Davis’ Hunderby. In February 2015, Shearsmith was interviewed by Adam Buxton on BBC Radio 4's Chain Reaction and he then interviewed Bob Mortimer.

He appeared in Hangmen at the Royal Court Theatre from Thursday 10 September to Saturday 10 October 2015.

In 2016, he appeared in Mid Morning Matters With Alan Partridge, American musical comedy series Galavant and dark comedy thriller Stag. He appeared live at Latitude Festival in Southwold, Suffolk.

A Christmas special of Inside No. 9 aired in December 2016 and a third series in 2017.

In 2017, Shearsmith appeared in the part-animated film Borley Rectory: The Most Haunted House in England. It was written and directed by Ashley Thorpe and co-starred Jonathan Rigby. Shearsmith also appeared in the title role in The Dresser at the Chichester Festival Theatre, as well as reuniting with The League of Gentlemen for three television specials, transmitted on BBC2 in December 2017.

Shearsmith appeared as himself in the 2018 short film To Trend on Twitter in aid of young people with cancer charity CLIC Sargent with fellow comedians David Baddiel, Steve Pemberton, Helen Lederer and actor Jason Flemyng.

In 2020, he received a nomination for the Laurence Olivier Award for Best Actor in a Supporting Role for his performance as The President and Jon in A Very Expensive Poison at The Old Vic.

In 2021, he appeared as a contestant in the 4th series of The Great British Bake Off For Stand Up To Cancer. For his performance in Series 5 of Inside No. 9, Shearsmith received a nomination for Best Male Comedy Performance at the 2021 British Academy Television Awards. In December 2021, Shearsmith and Pemberton toured the UK as Inside No.9: An Evening With Reece Shearsmith and Steve Pemberton answering fan questions and share behind-the-scenes stories from the series.

In April 2022, Shearsmith once again co-wrote and starred in the seventh series of Inside No. 9. The series premiered on 20 April 2022.

In May 2022, Shearsmith starred as Peter in The Unfriend, alongside Frances Barber and Amanda Abbington. The play was written by Steven Moffatt and directed by Mark Gatiss. The play transferred to the West End in 2023.

In September 2022, Shearsmith starred in Tom George's film See How They Run, where he played British film producer John Woolf. 

On the Empire Podcast episode # 532, recorded on 10th September 2022, Shearsmith announced that he had filmed a part in Emerald Fennell's upcoming thriller film Saltburn, about an aristocratic English family.

Personal life
Shearsmith and his wife, Jane, have two children.

Works

Film

Television

Stage

Publications

Radio

References

External links
 

1969 births
Living people
20th-century English male actors
21st-century English male actors
Alumni of Bretton Hall College
Comedians from Yorkshire
English male comedians
English male film actors
English television writers
English radio writers
English male television actors
Male actors from Kingston upon Hull
Male actors from Yorkshire
The League of Gentlemen
Writers from Kingston upon Hull
British male television writers